Pelizzari is a surname. Notable people with the surname include:

Denis Pelizzari (born 1960), French cyclist
Federico Pelizzari (born 2000), Italian para alpine skier
Umberto Pelizzari (born 1965), Italian freediver

See also
Pellizzari (disambiguation)